Ulster University at Jordanstown Football Club (also known as UUJ) is a Northern Irish, intermediate football club playing in Division 1A of the Northern Amateur Football League. It is affiliated with the Ulster University at Jordanstown.

The club was founded as part of Ulster Polytechnic in 1972 and entered the Irish League B Division. The club became UUJ with the amalgamation of the Polytechnic and the New University of Ulster as the University of Ulster in 1984. In 1991, it resigned from the B Division and dropped into the Amateur League. In line with the University's rebrand in October 2014, the club updated its name.

History

Banned from Collingwood
On Sunday, 22 February 2015, UU Jordanstown were due to play UCD in the first round of the Collingwood Cup. However on Friday, 19 February, just two days earlier, the Irish Universities Football Union barred them from the competition. UUJ were banned because they planned to field players from Magee College in the team. Ulster University wanted to enter a single team featuring players from three campuses – Coleraine, Jordanstown and Magee. However football officials at Coleraine opposed this idea and entered the Collingwood Cup under their own name. Meanwhile UU decided to enter the tournament as Jordanstown, while Magee opted not to enter the competition. With the Magee club not involved, UU decided to enter a joint team that included players from both Jordanstown and Magee. However, they were informed by IUFU that it was against Collingwood Cup rules to select players from more than one campus. As UU refused to comply with the IUFU requests and enter a team that only consisted of players from the Jordanstown campus, the IUFU opted to expel them from the competition.

Honours
Northern Amateur Football League 1B: 1
2005–06, 2017-2018
Northern Amateur Football League 3E: 1
1991–92
Collingwood Cup: 6
1980, 1996, 1997, 2001, 2006, 2008
Collingwood Plate: 1
1979
North/South University League: 3
1979–80, 1990–91, 1991–92

References

External links
 UUJ FC Official Club Website
 nifootball.co.uk - (For fixtures, results and tables of all Northern Ireland amateur football leagues)

Association football clubs in Northern Ireland
Association football clubs established in 1972
Association football clubs in County Antrim
University and college association football clubs in Ireland
University and college football clubs in Northern Ireland
Northern Amateur Football League clubs
Jord
1972 establishments in Northern Ireland
Newtownabbey